Agarzya is a rural locality (a village) in Chernushinsky District, Perm Krai, Russia. The population was 12 as of 2010. There is 1 street.

Geography 
Agarzya is located 38 km east of Chernushka (the district's administrative centre) by road. Agarzinsky is the nearest rural locality.

References 

Rural localities in Chernushinsky District